William Jackson Atherton (4 May 1905 – 1976) was an English footballer who played in the Football League for Bradford (Park Avenue), Doncaster Rovers and Halifax Town .

Personal life
He married Marjorie Cure in Bradford in 1933. They had two children.

Ancestry
He a direct descendant  of Gawain Atherton. His distant Atherton relatives include the American historian Lewis Eldon Atherton and politician, Gibson Atherton. He is related to Bobby Atherton and Tommy Atherton.

References

1905 births
1976 deaths
English footballers
Association football forwards
English Football League players
Bradford (Park Avenue) A.F.C. players
Doncaster Rovers F.C. players
Halifax Town A.F.C. players
Preston North End F.C. players